Michael Burtscher (born March 8, 1985) is a Filipino-Swiss former professional basketball player in the Philippine Basketball Association.

Initially one of the 51 rookie aspirants in the 2009 PBA draft, Burtscher was selected as the sixth overall pick by the Alaska Aces. Burtscher won his first ring as a rookie when he played for the Aces for two seasons before being traded to the then B-Meg Llamados and winning his second PBA championship. Shortly after winning his first title, Burtscher was waived by the Llamados. He was later signed to the San Miguel Beermen of the ASEAN Basketball League where he also won a championship. The entry of two new expansions teams in the PBA signaled his return to the second oldest league in the world, he was signed by the then Kia Sorento where he played for a season averaging 3 points per game.

Burtscher hinted his retirement on September 10, 2016 on his Facebook account citing that his 'heart isn't on the game anymore'. Four days later, he finally made an official announcement thanking all the people who contributed to his 'good career'. Burtscher currently enjoys being an indigenous people advocate, photographer and philanthropist.

PBA career statistics

Season-by-season averages

|-
| align=left | 
| align=left | Alaska
| 13 || 5.8 || .312 || .000 || .167 || 1.2 || .1 || .1 || .2  || .9
|-
| align=left | 
| align=left | B-Meg
| 12 || 1.9 || .125 || .000 || .000 || .6 || .0 || .0 || .3 || .2
|-
| align=left | 
| align=left | Air21
| 2 || 5.0 || .000 || .000 || .000 || 1.0 || .0 || .0 || .0 || .0
|-
| align=left | 
| align=left | Air21
| 31 || 7.6 || .419 || .000 || .667 || 1.4 || .2 || .0 || .3 || 1.2
|-
| align=left | 
| align=left | Kia
| 11 || 10.8 || .478 || .000 || .500 || 1.7 || .2 || .1 || .6 || 2.5
|-
| align=left | Career
| align=left |
| 69 || 6.7 || .385 || .000 || .516 || 1.2 || .1 || .0 || .3 || 1.1

References

1985 births
Living people
Air21 Express players
Alaska Aces (PBA) players
Centers (basketball)
Filipino men's basketball players
Terrafirma Dyip players
Power forwards (basketball)
Magnolia Hotshots players
Swiss men's basketball players
People from Baden, Switzerland
Swiss people of Filipino descent
Filipino people of Swiss descent
Alaska Aces (PBA) draft picks
Sportspeople from Aargau